Cornifin-A is a protein that in humans is encoded by the SPRR1A gene.

References

Further reading